Stoppani Glacier is a valley glacier located in Alberto de Agostini National Park, Isla Grande de Tierra del Fuego.

Glaciers of Magallanes Region
Isla Grande de Tierra del Fuego